Triaxomera caucasiella is a moth of the family Tineidae. It found in Russia (the Caucasus).

References

Moths described in 1959
Nemapogoninae
Taxa named by Aleksei Konstantinovich Zagulyaev